Randy Alan George (born November 1, 1964) is a United States Army general who has served as the 38th vice chief of staff of the United States Army since August 5, 2022. He previously served as the senior military assistant to the United States Secretary of Defense. Raised in Alden, Iowa, George earned a Bachelor of Science degree from the United States Military Academy in 1988. He later received a master's degree in economics from the Colorado School of Mines and a second master's degree in international security studies from the Naval War College.

Awards and decorations

References

|-

|-

|-

1964 births
Living people
Place of birth missing (living people)
People from Hardin County, Iowa
United States Military Academy alumni
Colorado School of Mines alumni
Naval War College alumni
Recipients of the Defense Distinguished Service Medal
Recipients of the Distinguished Service Medal (US Army)
Recipients of the Defense Superior Service Medal
Recipients of the Legion of Merit
United States Army generals
United States Army personnel of the Gulf War
United States Army personnel of the Iraq War
United States Army personnel of the War in Afghanistan (2001–2021)
United States Army Vice Chiefs of Staff